The Kent Women cricket team is the women's representative cricket team for the English county of Kent. They play their home matches at County Cricket Ground, Beckenham, as well as the St Lawrence Ground and Polo Farm, both in Canterbury. They are captained by Tammy Beaumont and are coached by David Hathrill. They are the most successful side in both the Women's County Championship and Women's Twenty20 Cup, with 8 and 3 titles respectively. They are partnered with the regional side South East Stars.

History

1935–1996: Early History
Kent Women played their first recorded match in 1935, against Civil Service Women. Over the following years, Kent were one of the most prolific women's sides, playing various one-off and tourist games, against surrounding counties and national sides such as Australia, New Zealand and the Netherlands. Kent joined the Women's Area Championship in 1980, and played in the competition until 1996 (including one title win, in 1986), after which they joined the Women's County Championship.

1997–2019: Women's County Championship
In 1997, their first season in the County Championship, Kent finished 5th in Division One with just one win. Over the next few seasons, Kent were a consistently mid-table side, plus one season in Division Two, in 2002.  A steady improvement after their promotion, however, eventually led them to their first Championship title, in 2006. They retained their title in 2007, going unbeaten in both seasons. Key to their success was England captain Charlotte Edwards, who played for Kent from 2000 to 2016. This started an extremely successful era for Kent Women, winning the most titles in Championship history, eight, and only finishing outside the top 3 of Division 1 once, in 2017: the further times they won the Championship were in 2009, 2011, 2012, 2014, 2016 and 2019. In 2016, Kent bowlers Megan Belt, Tash Farrant and Charlotte Pape were the first, third and fourth leading wicket-takers respectively, whilst Tammy Beaumont was the leading run-scorer. Kent batters Fran Wilson, Tammy Beaumont and Maxine Blythin were all in the top ten leading run-scorers in 2019.

Kent Women have also been the most successful side in the history of the Women's Twenty20 Cup, winning the tournament three times, in 2011, 2013 and 2016. They also reached the semi-finals of the competition in 2013 and 2012, losing to Berkshire both times. In 2011, however, they beat Berkshire by 8 wickets after bowling them out for just 73. In 2013, Kent beat Sussex in the final by 8 wickets, whilst in 2016 they won the title by topping Division One, with five wins from seven games. In 2021, they competed in the South East Group of the Twenty20 Cup, and won their region, going unbeaten with 6 wins and 2 matches abandoned due to rain. In 2022, they finished second in their group in the Twenty20 Cup, going on to lose in the final against Sussex. Kent have also competed in the Women's London Championship since its first edition in 2020, and won their first London Championship title in 2021.

Players

Current squad

Players listed below are named as Kent squad players on the team's website. Other players may play matches for the side.  denotes players with international caps.

Notable players
Players who have played for Kent and played internationally are listed below, in order of first international appearance (given in brackets):

 Betty Archdale (1934)
 Doris Turner (1934)
 Marjorie Richards (1935)
 Cecilia Robinson (1949)
 Audrey Disbury (1957)
 Ruth Westbrook (1957)
 Mollie Hunt (1960)
 Alison Ratcliffe (1960)
 Kathleen Smith (1960)
 Ann Jago (1960)
 Liz Amos (1961)
 Jacqueline Elledge (1963)
 Mary Pilling (1963)
 Jean Clark (1968)
 Chris Watmough (1968)
 Heather Dewdney (1969)
 Jill Cruwys (1969)
 Katherine Brown (1973)
 Susan Goatman (1973)
 Sue Hilliam (1973)
 Megan Lear (1973)
 Jill Powell (1979)
 June Edney (1984)
 Mickey de Boer (1984)
 Julie May (1986)
 Lisa Nye (1988)
 Caroline Barrs (1988)
 Marie Moralee (1991)
 Emily Drumm (1992)
 Olivia Magno (1995)
 Claire Whichcord (1995)
 Charlotte Edwards (1996)
 Paula Flannery (2000)
 Cri-Zelda Brits (2002)
 Sarah Burke (2003)
 Lydia Greenway (2003)
 Jo Watts (2005)
 Suzie Bates (2006)
 Lynsey Askew (2006)
 Laura Marsh (2006)
 Tammy Beaumont (2009)
 Erin Bermingham (2010)
 Lauren Griffiths (2010)
 Fran Wilson (2010)
 Susie Rowe (2010)
 Tash Farrant (2013)
 Alice Davidson-Richards (2018)
 Sarah Bryce (2018)
 Kirstie Gordon (2018)
 Arlene Kelly (2022)
 Elysa Hubbard (2022)

Seasons

Women's County Championship

Women's Twenty20 Cup

Honours
 Women's Area Championship:
 Champions (1) – 1986
 County Championship:
 Division One champions (8) – 2006, 2007, 2009, 2011, 2012, 2014, 2016, 2019
 Women's Twenty20 Cup:
 Champions (3) – 2011, 2013, 2016
 Group winners (1) – 2021

See also
 Kent County Cricket Club
 South East Stars

References

Cricket in Kent
Women's cricket teams in England
Kent County Cricket Club